The Zambia women's national rugby union team are a national sporting side of Zambia, representing them at rugby union. The side first played in 2007.

History
Zambia played their first international test match against Zimbabwe in 2007. In 2019, They played Zimbabwe twice and won the Victoria Cup.

In 2021, Zambia and Namibia faced each other for the first time. Zambia thrashed Namibia 75–5 at Windhoek.

Results summary
(Full internationals only)

Results

Full internationals

Other matches

References

African national women's rugby union teams
Rugby union in Zambia
Rugby
Women's national rugby union teams